Matthew Sharpe (born 1962) is a United States novelist and short story writer.

Bibliography

Stories from the Tube (short stories, 1998)
Nothing Is Terrible (novel, 2000)
The Sleeping Father (novel, 2003)
Jamestown (novel, 2007)
You Were Wrong (novel, Bloomsbury 2010)

External links
the Village Voice reviews The Sleeping Father
the Washington Post reviews Jamestown

1962 births
Living people
21st-century American novelists
American male novelists
Bard College faculty
Columbia University faculty
New College of Florida faculty
Wesleyan University faculty
Novelists from Connecticut
Writers from New York City
21st-century American male writers
Novelists from New York (state)
Novelists from Florida